Foodstirs is an American cooking and lifestyle company that produces baking kits, mixes and baked treats for sale online, by subscription, or in retail stores nationwide. One of the company's co-founders is actress Sarah Michelle Gellar. It is headquartered in Santa Monica, California.

The company was named to the CNBC Upstart 25 list in February 2017.

History
Foodstirs was founded by Galit Laibow, Greg Fleishman, and Sarah Michelle Gellar in Santa Monica, California in July 2015. In July 2015, the company raised an undisclosed amount of money in seed funding from an investor group that included Mucker Capital, BAM Ventures, and Third Wave Digital. The company was based in Mucker Capital's Santa Monica accelerator, MuckerLab.

The first Foodstirs products were launched in October 2015 and were sold online and via subscription. In the summer of 2016, the company's products became available in Whole Foods Markets in the Northeastern United States and Gelson's Markets in Southern California. In October 2016, Foodstirs raised an undisclosed amount of money in series A funding from an investor group including Mucker Capital, Beechwood Capital, Cambridge Companies SPG, and Jel Sert President, Ken Wegner.

Products
Foodstirs sells baking kits, mixes, and fresh baked treats that contain only organic and non-GMO ingredients with no artificial preservatives, flavors, or colors. There are three "signature" baking mixes which contain recipes for brownies, cookies, and cupcakes. The company offers a variety of specialty baking kits that come with decorative supplies and tools. All kits and mixes are designed to be kid-friendly (with parent supervision) and generally require six steps or less to complete. The kits are sold online, via subscription, with mixes and fresh baked treats sold at 7,500 retailers nationwide including Starbucks, Whole Foods, Walmart, WW and Amazon.

References

External links
Official website

American companies established in 2015
2015 establishments in California
Food and drink companies established in 2015
Companies based in Santa Monica, California
Food and drink companies based in California